Marthaville is an unincorporated community and census-designated place (CDP) in Natchitoches Parish, Louisiana. It was first listed as a CDP in the 2020 census with a population of 90. It is part of the Natchitoches Micropolitan Statistical Area.

History
Marthaville was founded in 1851. The founder, John Jackson Rains, named the town after his wife, Martha Ann Whitlock Rains. The town, during its peak, had a train stop, a bank, general store, bar, and hotel, etc. In the late 1960s, the railroad was removed and the town experienced an economic downturn. Now it is an unincorporated community, still having the store, post office, etc., and it is home to at least a dozen churches in the area in addition to an Elementary and Junior High school.

Geography
Marthaville is located on the western edge of Natchitoches Parish, seven miles west of Robeline near the border with Sabine Parish.

Demographics

2020 census

Note: the US Census treats Hispanic/Latino as an ethnic category. This table excludes Latinos from the racial categories and assigns them to a separate category. Hispanics/Latinos can be of any race.

Arts and culture
The Marthaville Good Ole Days Festival is "A two-day September festival that celebrates the past with activities for the whole family, including games, live entertainment, arts and crafts, a parade, and delicious food." The Marthaville Good Ole Days Festival attracts about 1,500 people to the area.

References

Unincorporated communities in Louisiana
Unincorporated communities in Natchitoches Parish, Louisiana
Census-designated places in Natchitoches Parish, Louisiana